The Robert S. Davis House is a historic house at 50 Stanton Road in Brookline, Massachusetts.  Built about 1859 for the scion of a locally prominent family, it is one of the town's best-preserved examples of Italianate architecture.  It was listed on the National Register of Historic Places in 1985.

Description and history
The Robert S. Davis House is located in a residential area between Brookline Village and the town high school, at the southeast corner of Stanton and Greenough Streets.  It is a -story wood-frame house, three bays wide, with a side-gable roof, twin interior chimneys, and a cupola.  It has well-preserved Italianate styling, including corner quoins, deep eaves with dentil moulding and paired brackets, heavily capped windows on the first floor, and a central gable on the main facade.

The land on which this house was built belonged to Robert Sharp Davis, Sr. a descendant of Ebenezer Davis, who owned land in Brookline since the mid-18th century.  It was built for Davis' son, also named Robert Sharp Davis, and is one of four similar Italianate houses in the immediate area.  It is particularly rare as a well-preserved example of the classic Italianate box-like house with a central gable; most of the town's other Italianate houses outside this grouping are L-shaped in layout.  The elder Davis' brother was Thomas Aspinwall Davis, who owned land on the other side of Brookline Village, and served as Mayor of Boston.

See also
National Register of Historic Places listings in Brookline, Massachusetts

References

Houses in Brookline, Massachusetts
Italianate architecture in Massachusetts
Houses completed in 1859
National Register of Historic Places in Brookline, Massachusetts
Houses on the National Register of Historic Places in Norfolk County, Massachusetts